Salvia algeriensis is an annual Salvia native to northeast Morocco and northwest Algeria, found growing at up to   elevation. The plant has a light scent when crushed, similar to thyme.

Notes

algeriensis
Flora of Algeria
Flora of Morocco
Plants described in 1798
Taxa named by René Louiche Desfontaines